Stamford School is an independent school for boys in Stamford, Lincolnshire in the English public school tradition. Founded in 1532, it has been a member of the Headmasters' and Headmistresses' Conference since 1920. With the girls-only Stamford High School and the coeducational Stamford Junior School, it is part of the Stamford Endowed Schools (SES). From September 2023, Stamford will become co-educational.

History

The school was founded in 1532 by a local merchant and alderman, William Radcliffe, who had been encouraged when younger by Lady Margaret Beaufort, (died 1509) mother of Henry VII, though there is evidence to suggest that a school existed from the beginning of the fourteenth century.  Founded as a chantry school, it fell foul of the Protestant reformers and was only saved from destruction under the Chantries Act of Edward VI by the personal intervention of Sir William Cecil (later Lord Burghley) who worked in the service of Edward Seymour, 1st Duke of Somerset and who secured a specific Act of Parliament in 1548 ensuring its survival. Apart from the chantries of the University of Oxford and the University of Cambridge, only those of Eton College, Winchester College, Berkhamsted, St Albans and Stamford schools survived.

Teaching is believed to have begun in the Corpus Christi chapel of Stamford's twelfth-century church of St Mary, but by 1566 was taking place in the remaining portion of the redundant St Paul's Church, originally built no later than 1152. This building continued in use as a school room until the early twentieth century when it was restored and extended and, in 1930, returned to use as a chapel. In 1961, a nineteenth-century Gray and Davison pipe organ was installed although this was removed in the 1990s and replaced with an electronic substitute.  Over its history the school has built or absorbed seventeenth-, eighteenth- and nineteenth-century buildings, besides the site of a further demolished medieval church (Holy Trinity/St Stephen's) and remains of Brazenose College built by the secessionists from the University of Oxford in the fourteenth century. Brasenose College, Oxford bought Brazenose House in 1890 to recover the original medieval brass Brazenose knocker.

The right of appointment of the school's master, a position hotly contested in past centuries on account of the post's disproportionately large salary, was shared between the Mayor of Stamford and the Master of St John's College, Cambridge.  Both Stamford Town Council and St John's College still have nominees on the school's governing body. Stamford School has a sister school, Stamford High School which was founded in 1877. The funds for the foundation of the High School and the further financial endowment of the existing boys' school were appropriated from the endowment of Browne's Hospital by Act of Parliament in 1871. This trust had been established for the relief of poverty by William Browne (died 1489), another wealthy wool merchant and alderman of the town, and his gift is commemorated in the name of a school house.

From 1975, Lincolnshire County Council purchased places at Stamford School and Stamford High School on the basis that Stamford had no LEA grammar school (unlike the county's other towns). This local form of the Assisted Places Scheme provided funding to send children to the two schools that were formerly direct-grant grammars. The national Assisted Places Scheme was ended by the Labour government in 1997 but the Stamford arrangements remained in place as an increasingly protracted transitional arrangement. In 2006, Lincolnshire County Council agreed to taper down from 50 the number of county scholarships to the Stamford Endowed Schools so that there would be no new scholarships from 2012.

In recent years, the two schools have been united under the leadership of a single principal as the Stamford Endowed Schools. This organisation now comprises Stamford Junior School, a co-educational establishment for pupils aged between 2 and 11 years, Stamford School for boys aged 11–18, and Stamford High School catering for girls of the same age group. Sixth Form teaching is carried out jointly between Stamford School and Stamford High School. Stamford will become co-educational from September 2023 and will be fully co-educational in every year group from September 2024.

Stamford School has four senior (Y10–Y13) houses.  These are called Brazenose, Radcliffe, Ancaster and Exeter. There are also four junior house systems, each the same colour as their senior counterparts, and these are named St Peter's, St Paul's, Willoughby and Cecil.  There are also three boarding houses: Byard, for boys aged 11 to 14; St Paul's, for boys aged 14 – 16; and Browne, which houses boys aged 16 to 18. The four junior (Y7–Y9) houses are Cecil (feeder house to Exeter), Willoughby (feeder house to Ancaster), St Paul's (feeder house to Radcliffe) and St Peter’s (feeder house to Brazenose). Brazenose and Radcliffe traditionally housed town boys, while Ancaster and Exeter accommodated boys who lived respectively north and south of the River Welland. Additional boarding houses within the Stamford Endowed Schools are St Michael's (boys and girls 8–11), St Martin's (girls 11-13), Welland (girls 13–16) and Park (girls 16–18).

Since 1885 The Stamfordian has been the school magazine of Stamford School. Currently published annually in the Autumn term, it provides for current pupils and parents as well as Old Stamfordians and prospective parents an account of a year in the life of the school.

The school has rivalries with nearby Uppingham School, Oakham School and Oundle School.

School crest
The school's crest is a stork (the spede bird) with wings displayed on a wool bale over the motto + me spede, that is Christ me spede. The emblem was adopted from medieval wool merchant, William Browne, after the school had been re-endowed from Browne's Charity in 1873. (The stork is supposed to be a rebus on his wife, Margaret's maiden name of Stoke). The current form was designed by Nelson Dawson.

School Traditions

Whilst originally a tradition for students joining the school, the school tradition of kissing the stone head above the chapel (“kissing the old man”) has now become a right of passage for Y13 students leaving the school.

On the last day of lessons before their leave of absence for exams, a football game is played between students in their final year at the school colloquially known as "the Year 13 El Clásico".

Notable alumni (Old Stamfordians)

Politics and public service
 Nick Anstee, Lord Mayor of London
 Simon Burns, Conservative MP for West Chelmsford, Minister of State
 John Cecil, 5th Earl of Exeter, MP for Stamford, Grand Tourist and connoisseur
 William Cecil, 1st Baron Burghley, Lord High Treasurer of England and chief advisor to Queen Elizabeth I
 Alfred Harmsworth, 1st Viscount Northcliffe, newspaper magnate, founder of the Daily Mail and Daily Mirror, owner of The Times
 J. F. Horrabin, Labour MP for Peterborough, journalist and broadcaster
 Sir Thomas Wilson, author, translator, diplomat, Member of Parliament, Keeper of the King's Records

Law
 Sir Richard Cayley, Chief Justice of Ceylon
 Sir Ronald Long, President of The Law Society
 Nicholas Fluck, President of The Law Society

Music

 Sir Malcolm Sargent, conductor
 Sir Michael Tippett, composer
 Julian Wastall, composer

Literature and the arts
 Michael Asher, author and explorer
 Torben Betts, playwright
 Nelson Dawson, silversmith, jeweller, designer, etcher and painter of the Arts and Crafts movement.
 Colin Dexter, author of the Inspector Morse detective novels; Morse is described as an Old Stamfordian
 Neil McCarthy, film and television actor
 Francis Peck, antiquary
 John Radford, wine writer and broadcaster
 Ralph Robinson, Renaissance scholar, first translator into English of Thomas More's Utopia
 Thomas Seaton, founder of Seatonian Prize for Poetry at the University of Cambridge
 John Terraine, military historian
 Ben Willbond, film and television actor
George Robinson, television actor and presenter

Military
 Simon Bryant, Commander-in-Chief, Air Command, Royal Air Force
 John Drewienkiewicz
 Apparanda Aiyappa, Indian Army
 Mike Jackson, Chief of the General Staff.

Academia and the church
 Martin Aitken, professor of archaeometry, University of Oxford, Fellow of Linacre College, Oxford
 Zachary Brooke, Lady Margaret's Professor of Divinity, University of Cambridge
 Henry Edwards, Dean of Bangor
 Charles John Ellicott, professor of divinity at King's College London and the University of Cambridge and Bishop of Gloucester and Bristol
 Philip Goodrich, Bishop of Worcester
 Malcolm Jeeves, psychologist
 Steven V. Ley, BP (1702) Professor of Chemistry at the University of Cambridge, Fellow of Trinity College, Cambridge
 Cecil Richard Norgate, bishop of Masasi, Tanzania
 Ian Roberts, professor of linguistics University of Cambridge, Fellow of Downing College
 M. Stanley Whittingham, lithium-ion battery pioneer and 2019 Nobel Prize in Chemistry laureate

Commerce and industry
 Oliver Hemsley, CEO, Numis Securities

Sport
 Robert Clift, gold medal winning hockey player at the 1988 Seoul Olympics
 Simon Hodgkinson, England international rugby
 Mark James, golfer and captain European Ryder Cup team
 Shan Masood, Pakistani Test cricketer
 Alexander Sims, racing driver in Formula E
 M. J. K. Smith, England international rugby, England international cricket captain
 Iwan Thomas, Olympic athlete
 Joey Evison, Nottinghamshire county cricket

Notable schoolmasters

 Robert Browne, clergyman and founder of the Brownists
 Walter Francis Edward Douglas
  William Dugard, headmaster of Merchant Taylors' School, Northwood, Royalist propagandist, printer of Basilikon Doron, a treatise on government written in 1599 by James VI of Scotland, the future James I of England
 Gerard Hoffnung, musician, humourist, cartoonist
 Gizz Butt, former live guitarist for The Prodigy
 Dean Headley, Rugby and Cricket professional
 Harold Andrew Mason
 F. L. Woodward
 Anthony Ewbank

See also
 History of Brasenose College, Oxford
 St Paul's Church, Stamford – The school chapel

Further reading
B. L. Deed, OBE, TD, The History of Stamford School, Cambridge University Press, 1954 (1st edition); 1982 (2nd edition).

References

External links

 Profile on the ISC website
 Stamford Endowed Schools website
 Photographs of Stamford School
 The Foundation Card

The recent issues of the Stamfordian magazine can be downloaded
Stamfordian 2005 (PDF 15MB)
Stamfordian 2006 (PDF 10MB)
Stamfordian 2007 (PDF 15MB)

Educational institutions established in the 1530s
Boarding schools in Lincolnshire
Private schools in Lincolnshire
1532 establishments in England
Member schools of the Headmasters' and Headmistresses' Conference
Boys' schools in Lincolnshire
Buildings and structures in Stamford, Lincolnshire
Education in Stamford, Lincolnshire
Diamond schools